The mayor of Richmond was the head of the municipal government of Richmond, New Zealand. The position existed from 1891, when the Borough of Richmond was formed, until the borough was amalgamated into Tasman District in the 1989 local government reforms.

History
Richmond became a borough in 1891. George Talbot was elected as the first mayor and he held the position until he retired in 1903. William Coleman, the fifth mayor, was elected in April 1913, but by June he had fallen ill. George Edward Chisnall deputised for Coleman for the rest of the term until the next election in April 1914. Chisnall stood in the 29 April 1914 election and narrowly beat James Hunt, a previous mayor. In April 1915, Hunt was returned unopposed. Thomas Bell became mayor in April 1917 being the only candidate. He died from a brain aneurysm the next month. Bell was succeeded by William Wilkes, who retired after tree two-year terms in 1923. Wilkes was succeeded by James Haycock, who was declared elected unopposed in April 1923. Haycock died in October 1923. James Hunt won the resulting by-election and served the remainder of the two-year term until April 1925, when he retired. George Kidd won the April 1925 election. Shortly before the end of his two-year term, Kidd resigned in February 1927 over health concerns, and councillor Warren Kelly was elected by his fellow councillors for the remaining two months.

At the April 1927 local election, Richmond Borough was faced with the unusual problem of not having received any nominations for the mayoralty. Similarly, for the six positions available as councillors, only three nominations were received. When another call was made for nominations two weeks later, former mayor Hunt was the only candidate and thus declared elected. Kelly and Hunt contested the 1 May 1929 mayoral election, with Kelly getting elected.

Albert Tuffnell, who had been deputy mayor from 1935 to 1938, was elected mayor in 1938.

Maurice (Morrie) McGlashen was mayor from 1947 to 1959. His son, Muir McGlashen, was mayor from 1962 to 1974.

Kerry Marshall, the last mayor of Richmond, became the first mayor of Tasman.

List of office holders
Richmond Borough Council had the following mayors:

References

 
Richmond
People from the Tasman District